Walter Flores is a Costa Rican musician. His mother, Maria de los Angeles Mora, and his father Walter Flores, educated him about music since he was a child. He began his education at the Conservatorio de Castella, Universidad de Costa Rica, and then at Berklee College of Music . He is currently married, and has two twin daughters. He lives in Costa Rica.
He directed Ruben Blades' orchestra for over five years, playing concerts in festivals such as Amsterdam's "Holland RootsFest", Paris's "La Villette JazzFest", Germany's "Westport JazzFest", Switzerland's "Montreux Jazz Festival", New York's "Sessions at 54th" and Carnegie Hall, amongst others.

Flores has won five Grammy Awards, two of them as producer of Mundo and Tiempos, CDs by Ruben Blades.

He is also the Editus ensemble director

References

External links
 
 Son de Tikizia

Grammy Award winners
Costa Rican musicians
Year of birth missing (living people)
Living people